The 2016 Miami Beach Bowl was a post-season American college football bowl game played on December 19, 2016 at Marlins Park in Miami, Florida. The third annual edition of the Miami Beach Bowl was one of the 2016–17 bowl games concluding the 2016 FBS football season.

Team selection
The game featured the Central Michigan Chippewas against the Tulsa Golden Hurricane.

This was the third meeting between the schools, with the all-time series tied 1–1.  The most recent meeting was on October 17, 1987, where the Chippewas defeated the Golden Hurricane by a score of 51–21.

Central Michigan

Tulsa

Game summary

Scoring summary

Source:

Statistics

References

2016–17 NCAA football bowl games
2016
2016 Miami Beach Bowl
2016 Miami Beach Bowl
2016 in sports in Florida
December 2016 sports events in the United States